The Palm Dog Award is a yearly alternative award presented by the international film critics during the Cannes Film Festival. Begun in 2001 by Toby Rose, it is awarded to the best performance by a canine (live or animated) or group of canines during the festival. The award consists of a leather dog collar with the term "PALM DOG". The name of the award is a play on words of the Palme d'Or, the festival's highest honor.

First reported in June 2002, the Palm Dog has been reported by major news outlets around the world, including Financial Times Deutschland, Sydney Morning Herald, The New York Times, the BBC, the Los Angeles Times, and ABC News. In 2012 the judges for the Palm Dog were The Times chief film critic Kate Muir, The Daily Telegraph's Robbie Collin, The Guardian's Peter Bradshaw and Heat Magazine's Charles Gant.

Award winners

2000s

2010s

2020s

References

External links
 Official website

Cannes Film Festival
Lists of films by award
Awards to animals
Awards established in 2001
Dogs in popular culture
2001 establishments in France